Christian McBride (born May 31, 1972) is an American jazz bassist, composer and arranger. He has appeared on more than 300 recordings as a sideman, and is an eight-time Grammy Award winner.

McBride has performed and recorded with a number of jazz musicians and ensembles, including Freddie Hubbard, McCoy Tyner, Herbie Hancock, Pat Metheny, Joe Henderson, Diana Krall, Roy Haynes, Chick Corea, Wynton Marsalis, Eddie Palmieri, Joshua Redman, and Ray Brown's "SuperBass" with John Clayton, as well as with pop, hip-hop, soul and classical musicians like Sting, Paul McCartney, Celine Dion, Isaac Hayes, The Roots, Queen Latifah, Kathleen Battle, Renee Fleming, Carly Simon, Bruce Hornsby, and James Brown.

Early life
McBride was born in Philadelphia on May 31, 1972. After starting on bass guitar, McBride switched to double bass.  He is a graduate of the Philadelphia High School for Creative and Performing Arts, and studied at the Juilliard School.

Later life and career

McBride was heralded as a teen prodigy when he joined saxophonist Bobby Watson's group, Horizon, at the age of 17. From age 17 to 22, McBride played in the bands of older musicians such as Watson, Freddie Hubbard, Benny Golson, George Duke,
Milt Jackson, J. J. Johnson and Hank Jones, as well as his peers such as Roy Hargrove, Benny Green, and Joshua Redman. In 1996, jazz bassist Ray Brown formed a group called SuperBass with McBride and fellow Brown protégé John Clayton. The group released two albums: SuperBass: Live at Scullers (1997) and SuperBass 2: Live at the Blue Note (2001).

McBride was a member of saxophonist Joshua Redman's Quartet in the early 1990s with pianist Brad Mehldau and drummer Brian Blade. McBride began leading his own groups in 1995 after the release of his debut album Gettin' to It (Verve). Saxophonist Tim Warfield, pianists Charles Craig and Joey Calderazzo, and drummers Carl Allen and Greg Hutchinson are among the musicians who played in McBride's early groups. From 2000 to 2008, McBride led his own ensemble, the Christian McBride Band, with saxophonist Ron Blake, pianist/keyboardist Geoffrey Keezer, and drummer Terreon Gully. The band released two albums: Vertical Vision (Warner Bros., 2003) and Live at Tonic (Ropeadope, 2006).

In 1996, McBride contributed to the AIDS benefit album Offbeat: A Red Hot Soundtrip produced by the Red Hot Organization.

McBride primarily plays double bass, but he is equally adept on bass guitar. He played both on the album The Philadelphia Experiment, which included keyboardist Uri Caine and hip-hop drummer Ahmir "Questlove" Thompson. Other projects have included tours and recordings with the Pat Metheny Trio, the Bruce Hornsby Trio, and Queen Latifah. Like Paul Chambers, McBride can solo by playing his bass arco style.

In 2006, McBride was named to the position of Creative Chair for Jazz with the Los Angeles Philharmonic, taking over from Dianne Reeves. He was signed to a two-year contract that was renewed for an additional two years. He was succeeded by Herbie Hancock in 2010.

McBride performed with Sonny Rollins and Roy Haynes at Carnegie Hall on September 18, 2007, in commemoration of Rollins' 50th anniversary of his first performance there. McBride was also tapped by CBS to be a producer for the tribute to Rollins on the 2011 Kennedy Center Honors broadcast.

In 2008, McBride joined John McLaughlin, Chick Corea, Kenny Garrett and Vinnie Colaiuta in a jazz fusion supergroup called the Five Peace Band. They released an album in February 2009 and completed their world tour in May of that year, as Brian Blade took over for Vinnie Colaiuta as drummer in Asia and some US concerts. The album Five Peace Band Live won the 2010 Grammy Award for Best Jazz Instrumental Album, Individual or Group

In 2011 McBride released his first big band album, The Good Feeling, for which he won the Grammy for Best Large Jazz Ensemble Performance.

McBride leads five groups: Inside Straight, featuring alto/soprano saxophonist Steve Wilson, vibraphonist Warren Wolf, pianist Peter Martin and drummer Carl Allen; a trio featuring pianist Christian Sands and drummer Jerome Jennings; his 18-piece big band; an experimental group called A Christian McBride Situation with pianist/keyboardist Patrice Rushen, turntablists DJ Logic and Jahi Sundance, saxophonist Ron Blake and vocalist Alyson Williams; and the New Jawn, featuring trumpeter Josh Evans, saxophonist Marcus Strickland, and drummer Nasheet Waits.

In March 2016, McBride was named artistic director of the Newport Jazz Festival, succeeding the festival's founder and artistic director, George Wein.

McBride hosts NPR's radio show, Jazz Night In America.

Personal life
Christian is married to jazz singer and educator Melissa Walker. Walker, with contributions by McBride, leads the Jazz House Kids, a jazz school in their home town of Montclair, New Jersey. Each summer, they both appear at the Montclair Jazz Festival, along with student ensembles led by the instructors, professional ensembles composed of instructors, and guest acts.

McBride shared the story of his first encounters with Freddie Hubbard in "The Gig" and his relationship with James Brown in "Mr. Soul On Top" on The Moth Radio Hour, a radio show and podcast devoted to story-telling.

Discography

As leader

Compilations 
 It's Christmas on Mack Avenue (Mack Avenue, 2014)

As sideman

See also 
 List of jazz bassists

References

External links
Official website
'Ep. 29: Featuring 6-time Grammy Award winning bassist Christian McBride' Interview by Tigran Arakelyan
"Industry Q&A with Christian McBride ", Jazzfuel.com, 26 November 2019.
Mack Avenue Artist Page
Chris M. Slawecki, "Christian McBride Throws Down", AllAboutJazz, May 23, 2006. Retrieved September 28, 2007
David Miller, "Live at Tonic", AllAboutJazz.com, May 21, 2006. Retrieved August 11, 2007
Donald True Van Deusen, "Christian McBride: Bass Beautiful" AllAboutJazz, October 6, 2004 Retrieved August 11, 2007
Todd S. Jenkins, "The Philadelphia Experiment", AllAboutJazz.com, July 1, 2001. Retrieved August 11, 2007
Nate Chinen, "A Situation Is Brewing, Acoustic and Fierce", New York Times, June 28, 2007. Retrieved March 8, 2009
Christian McBride Band MySpace Page
Conversation With Christian McBride, 10/01/2007
Christian McBride telling a story entitled "The Gig" on The Moth podcast
Conversation with Christian McBride - State of Mind, April 2006
Interview with Christian McBride for the NAMM (National Association of Music Merchants) Oral History Program July 18, 2015

1972 births
Living people
Jazz fusion musicians
American jazz double-bassists
Male double-bassists
American jazz bass guitarists
Grammy Award winners
African-American jazz musicians
Chesky Records artists
Guitarists from Philadelphia
American male bass guitarists
Jazz musicians from Pennsylvania
21st-century double-bassists
21st-century American bass guitarists
21st-century American male musicians
American male jazz musicians
Christian McBride Big Band members
Philadelphia High School for the Creative and Performing Arts alumni
Ropeadope Records artists
Mack Avenue Records artists
Verve Records artists
African-American guitarists
21st-century African-American musicians
20th-century African-American people